Michael Vey: The Prisoner of Cell 25  is a 2011 young adult/science fiction novel by Richard Paul Evans, the first book in a octology published by Glenn Beck's owned Mercury Ink. The story follows Michael Vey, a teenager with the ability to pulse or surge electricity out of the palms of his hands.

Synopsis 

Michael Vey is a teenager with Tourette's syndrome and an electrical superpower that he desperately works to keep hidden from the world. His abilities allow him to shock people through physical contact, much like an electric eel. He manages to remain inconspicuous and "normal" until the high school bullies, Jack, Mitchell and Wade, attack him. Michael loses control and shocks them, all in front of popular cheerleader Taylor Ridley. Michael worries that Taylor will tell everyone what she saw, but when she seeks him out over the next few days, Michael figures out that she also has electrical abilities. Michael, Taylor, and Ostin, Michael's genius best friend, form the Electroclan, a small club for people with unique electrical abilities. Michael and Taylor discover that they were both born at the Pasadena General hospital in California within a few days of each other, and that many infants born in that same time in the same hospital had mysteriously died. Soon after this discovery, the three of them realize that Michael and Taylor are being tracked by a secret organization called the Elgen, which they had linked to the mysterious deaths from fifteen years earlier. Both Michael and Taylor receive scholarships from the Elgen Academy, a prestigious school in Pasadena, and they grow nervous. When Michael tells his mother about the scholarship on his birthday a few days later, she is proud and excited, until he mentions the name of the school. Without explaining herself, she makes him leave PizzaMax, the restaurant where they are eating. On their way to the car, a man attempts to rob them. Michael shocks him, and another man appears, accompanied by two teenagers. The man identifies himself as Dr. James "Jim" Hatch. He knows about Michael and Taylor's abilities. The teenagers with him also have special electrical abilities. One of the teenagers, Zeus, shocks his mother, and the other, Nichelle, drains Michael's electricity until he passes out. Michael wakes up in a hospital and is told that his mother has been kidnapped.

Meanwhile, Taylor has been taken captive from her cheerleading practice by Nichelle and a few Elgen guards. She is transported to the Elgen Academy, where she finds out that she has an identical twin named Tara. She also learns that all of the students at the school have unique electrical abilities, and that Dr. Hatch classifies them as Glows. Taylor soon discovers the dark side of Dr. Hatch, as he likes to manipulate the teenagers into using their powers in bad ways. When Taylor refuses to obey, she is tortured by Nichelle and sent to Purgatory, a small cell in the basement with three other rebellious Glows: Ian, McKenna, and Abigail.

Michael makes a deal with Jack and Wade, who agree to drive Michael and Ostin to Pasadena to rescue Mrs. Vey and Taylor. When they arrive, Michael and the others try unsuccessfully to free Taylor, but are ultimately captured by the Elgen guards. Dr. Hatch interrogates Michael, then offers to let him join the school. To prove his loyalty, Michael is told he needs to shock and kill Wade. He refuses, and is sent to Cell 25 to be tortured. After 26 days, Michael is released from Cell 25 and brought before Dr. Hatch again, along with Ostin and Taylor. As part of his manipulation of Michael, Dr. Hatch leaves Zeus to kill Ostin and Taylor. Michael taunts Zeus into releasing a large bolt of lightning, which Michael sends back at him, knocking him out. In the end, Ostin and Taylor survive the blast from Zeus and Michael Vey. Taylor searches Zeus's memories and finds that Dr. Hatch manipulated him into believing that he killed his family. Zeus joins the Electroclan, and they break Ian, McKenna, and Abigail out of their cell. A lengthy battle ensues between the Electroclan and the Elgen, Dr. Hatch, and the other Glows. Michael and the Electroclan take over the control room and releases the human captives kept in the school (including Jack and Wade), who then overpower the remaining guards. Nichelle nearly defeats the Electroclan by draining their electricity, but Michael manages to overwhelm her. Dr. Hatch escapes from Elgen Academy in a helicopter with most of the other Glows.

Characters

 Michael Vey is the protagonist of the series. He is a teenager with Tourette's syndrome who is constantly bullied by his peers. Michael is a Glow, one of a few people who has electrical-based powers. His abilities allow him to "pulse" with electric energy, shocking people like an electric eel.
 Taylor Ridley is a very popular cheerleader at Meridian High, who Michael has a crush on. She is also a Glow who was undiscovered by Dr. Hatch. Her abilities allow her to access and scramble electrical signals in the brain, letting her read minds and even "reboot" them, much like with a computer.
 Ostin Liss is Michael's best friend and is considered a genius. He has no powers, but his brilliant mind is what sets him apart.
 Dr. Hatch is a scientist who founded the Elgen Academy. He is the antagonist, who manipulates the Glows and exploits their powers for his personal glory and ambition.
 Jack Vranes is one of the bullies at Meridian High who, along with his friends Wade West and Mitchell Manchester, often targets Michael. Jack drives Michael to Pasadena to rescue Mrs. Vey and Taylor from Elgen Academy.
 Wade West is one of the bullies at Meridian High. Wade died from being shot and had his funeral in Peru. Wade is a normal human who helped the Electroclan.
 Nichelle is a Glow who is loyal to Dr. Hatch. Her ability allows her literally suck away the power and energy from other Glows. The process is comparable to mosquitoes sucking blood from a host. Because of her nasty attitude and unique ability that only affects them, the other Glows at the Elgen Academy dislike her. She enjoys torturing the others with her dark power.
 Ian is a Glow who is first introduced in Purgatory with McKenna and Abigail. He is blind, but his ability allows him to see through what he calls electrolocation, which means that he can see through most substances and track anything with electricity, much like how a bat sees with echolocation.
 McKenna is a Glow who is first introduced in Purgatory with Ian and Abigail. She has the ability to create light and heat with any part of her body. She can heat herself to more than 3,000 Kelvin.
 Abigail, also known as Abi, is a Glow who is first introduced in Purgatory with Ian and McKenna. Her ability allows her to suppress pain by stimulating nerve endings through physical contact or conduction through metal.
 Grace acts as a “human flash drive,” and is able to transfer and store large amounts of electronic data. She left Dr. Hatch's group of electric children to join the Electroclan.
 Tanner is one of the Glows under Dr. Hatch's control. He has the ability to interfere with an aircraft's navigation and electrical systems, shutting them down and making them crash. He has murdered thousands of people under Dr. Hatch's orders.
 Tara is Taylor's identical twin sister who is immovable in her complete loyalty to Dr. Hatch. Like with her sister Taylor, Tara's abilities deal with manipulation of the mind. She can stimulate different parts of the brain to elicit emotions such as fear and happiness.
 Quentin, also known as Q, has the ability to produce a small EMP, or electromagnetic pulse. He is loyal to Dr. Hatch and is shown to be reckless and impulsive, acting without any regard to ordinary human beings.
 Bryan has the ability to generate highly-focused electricity that allows him to cut through solid objects, such as metal, by burning through them. He is loyal to Dr. Hatch, and, like Quentin, is proven to be reckless, acting without any regard to ordinary human beings.
 Kylee has the ability to create electromagnetic power, which means she is basically a human magnet. She is loyal to Dr. Hatch and the Elgen.
 Zeus has the ability to 'throw' lightning, getting his nickname from the ancient Greek god with the same ability. Zeus's real name is Leonard Frank Smith. He is the first Elgen supporter to defect and join the Electroclan.

Sequels
 Michael Vey: Rise of the Elgen on August 14, 2012
 Michael Vey: Battle of the Ampere on September 17, 2013
 Michael Vey: Hunt for the Jade Dragon on September 16, 2014
 Michael Vey: Storm of Lightning on September 15, 2015
 Michael Vey: Fall of Hades on September 13, 2016
 Michael Vey: The Final Spark on September 12, 2017
 Michael Vey: The Parasite on November 8, 2022

Honors
Number one book on the New York Times Chapter Book list for the week ending August 28, 2011.
Number one selling book in Barnes and Nobles, number 2 in Amazon.com for Michael Vey.
On August 25, it was ranked number 38 on USA Today's best sellers.
Michael Vey reached Number Seven on the chart for USA Today in August.
The Salt Lake Tribune announced that Michael Vey made number seven on the Deseret Book for the week of Aug. 22 through Aug. 27 chart.

References

External links 
 Michael Vey Official Site
 Richard Paul Evans Official Website

2011 American novels
2011 science fiction novels
American science fiction novels
American young adult novels
Prisoner of Cell 25 The, Michael Vey
Sequel novels
Superhero novels